Enoyl Coenzyme A hydratase, short chain, 1, mitochondrial, also known as ECHS1, is a human gene.

The protein encoded by this gene functions in the second step of the mitochondrial fatty acid beta-oxidation pathway. It catalyzes the hydration of 2-trans-enoyl-coenzyme A (CoA) intermediates to L-3-hydroxyacyl-CoAs. The gene product is a member of the hydratase/isomerase superfamily. It localizes to the mitochondrial matrix. Transcript variants utilizing alternative transcription initiation sites have been described in the literature.

Structure

The ECHS1 gene is approximately 11 kb in length, and is composed of eight exons, with exons I and VIII containing the 5'- and 3'-untranslated regions, respectively. There are two major transcription start sites, located 62 and 63 bp upstream of the translation codon, were mapped by primer extension analysis. The 5'-flanking region of the ECHS1 gene is GC-rich and contains several copies of the SP1 binding motive but no typical TATA or CAAT boxes are apparent. Alu repeat elements have been identified within the region -1052/-770 relative to the cap site and in intron 7. The precursor polypeptide contains 290 amino acid residues, with an N-terminal mitochondrial targeting domain (1-27,28,29) leading to a ragged mature N-terminus. The mRNA has a  5'-untranslated sequence of 21 bp and a 3'-untranslated sequence of 391 bp.

Function

Enoyl-CoA hydratase (ECH) catalyzes the second step in beta-oxidation pathway of fatty acid metabolism. The enzyme is involved in the formation of a β-hydroxyacyl-CoA thioester. The two catalytic glutamic acid residues are believed to act in concert to activate a water molecule, while Gly-141 is proposed to be involved in substrate activation. There are two potent inhibitors of ECHS, which irreversibly inactivate the enzyme via covalent adduct formation.

Clinical significance

Enoyl-CoA hydratase short chain has been confirmed to interact with STAT3, such that ECHS1 specifically represses STAT3 activity by inhibiting STAT3 phosphorylation. STAT3 can act as both an oncogene and a tumor suppressor. ECHS1 itself has shown to occur in many cancers, particularly in hypatocellular carcinoma (HCC) development; both exogenous and endogenous forms of ECHS1 bind to HBs and induce apoptosis as a result. This means that ECHS1 may be used in the future as a therapy for patients with HBV-related hepatitis or HCC.

References

Further reading

Mitochondrial proteins